Edward Gierwiałło (30 July 1951 – 24 September 2011) was a Polish property developer who founded the company Edbud in 1992. He was also a producer for a 2005 romantic comedy film called Lawstorant.

Personal life
He was married to the writer and poet Lidia Gierwiałło. He had two sons: Michał and Mateusz and two daughters: Marta and Aleksandra.

Death and tributes
He died on 24 September 2021, aged 60. He was buried at the Bródno cemetery in Warsaw, Poland (section 25C-6-12).

On July 9, 2012, he was posthumously awarded the title of Honorary Citizen of the City of Tarczyn for "activities for the development of the local community, supporting the Tarczyn commune through his skillful, constructive activities, contributing to the improvement of its image, and above all, for great concern for the good of his Little Homeland".

References 

Polish businesspeople
Polish film producers
1951 births
2011 deaths
Burials at Bródno Cemetery